Carsten Jensen (born 19 January 1960) is a Danish judoka. He competed in the men's half-heavyweight event at the 1984 Summer Olympics.

References

External links
 

1960 births
Living people
Danish male judoka
Olympic judoka of Denmark
Judoka at the 1984 Summer Olympics
People from Herning Municipality
Sportspeople from the Central Denmark Region